Lock-Keeper's House is a historic home located near Cedar Point, Goochland County, Virginia.  It was built about 1836, and is a two-story frame structure resting on a stone foundation of whitewashed, rough-faced, uncoursed ashlar.  It has a shallow gable roof and a shed roof porch that extends the length of the building. It was built to serve Lock Number 7 at Cedar Point and is the last remaining lock-keeper's house of the James River and Kanawha Canal system. It addition to being a residence, the lock-keeper's house served as a tavern and furnished accommodations for passengers and canal boat crews.

It was listed on the National Register of Historic Places in 1974.

References

Drinking establishments on the National Register of Historic Places in Virginia
Houses on the National Register of Historic Places in Virginia
Houses completed in 1836
Houses in Goochland County, Virginia
National Register of Historic Places in Goochland County, Virginia